Rustin Ed Goodman is an American politician from Georgia. Goodman is a Republican member of the Georgia State Senate for District 8.

References

Republican Party Georgia (U.S. state) state senators
21st-century American politicians
Living people
1977 births